Harpalus udege is a species of ground beetle in the subfamily Harpalinae. It was described by Lafer in 1989.

References

udege
Beetles described in 1989